Kyle Donovan Weaver (born February 18, 1986) is an American former professional basketball player. He played college basketball for Washington State University, and was drafted 38th overall by the Charlotte Bobcats in the 2008 NBA draft. Weaver, a 6'6" (1.98 m) shooting guard-small forward, was born in Beloit, Wisconsin. His father, LaMont Weaver, played collegiate basketball at the University of Wisconsin.

High school
Weaver attended Beloit Memorial High School, in Beloit, Wisconsin, where he played high school basketball.

College career
Weaver had a career-high 25 points and 12 rebounds in a 75–68 Washington State loss to Stanford on March 14, 2008, at the Staples Center, in Los Angeles, California.

Professional career
On August 11, 2008, Weaver was traded by the Charlotte Bobcats to the Oklahoma City Thunder, for a second-round draft pick from the 2009 NBA draft, which originally belonged to the New Jersey Nets. The Thunder assigned Weaver to the NBA Development League affiliate Tulsa 66ers, in April 2009, November 2009, March 2010, and April 2010.

Weaver spent the 2010 training camp with the Chicago Bulls, but he was waived on October 21. After spending several months in the NBA D-League, he was signed by the Utah Jazz, on March 30, 2011.

In April 2011, he signed with Spirou Charleroi in Belgium.

In July 2011, he joined the German team Alba Berlin.

In October 2012, he signed with the Memphis Grizzlies. On October 23, 2012, Weaver was waived by the Grizzlies. Weaver then signed with the Austin Toros. On February 25, 2013, Weaver was traded to the Canton Charge.

On August 19, 2013, he signed a one-year deal with Azzurro Napoli.

On October 28, 2014, he signed with Bnei Herzliya of Israel, for the 2014–15 season. On January 9, 2015, he was released by the Israeli team. On March 7, he signed with Caciques de Humacao, of the Puerto Rican Baloncesto Superior Nacional. He left the club after appearing in only two games.

On August 28, 2015, Weaver signed with the Roseto Sharks, for the 2015–16 Serie A2 Basket season.

On October 4, 2016, Weaver signed with the Polish club Pierniki Toruń, for the 2016–17 PLK season.

On August 3, 2017, Weaver signed with the Greek club Aris Thessaloniki for the 2017–18 season.

On August 8, 2018, Weaver inked with Neptūnas Klaipėda of the Lithuanian Basketball League (LKL).

On August 27, 2019, he has signed with Polski Cukier Toruń of the PLK.

Career statistics

NBA

Regular season

|-
| align="left" | 
| align="left" | Oklahoma City
| 56 || 19 || 20.8 || .459 || .344 || .707 || 2.4 || 1.8 || .8 || .4 || 5.3
|-
| align="left" | 
| align="left" | Oklahoma City
| 12 || 0 || 12.0 || .364 || .368 || .833 || 1.5 || .9 || .5 || .5 || 3.0
|-
| align="left" | 
| align="left" | Utah
| 5 || 0 || 13.8 || .360 || .429 || .875 || 2.0 || 1.4 || .4 || .4 || 5.6
|-
| align="left" | Career
| align="left" | 
| 73 || 19 || 18.9 || .441 || .353 || .736 || 2.2 || 1.6 || .8 || .5 || 5.0

Playoffs

|-
| align="left" | 2010
| align="left" | Oklahoma City
| 1 || 0 || 12.0 || .250 || .000 || .000 || 2.0 || 2.0 || .0 || .0 || 2.0
|-
| align="left" | Career
| align="left" | 
| 1 || 0 || 12.0 || .250 || .000 || .000 || 2.0 || 2.0 || .0 || .0 || 2.0

College

|-
| style="text-align:left;"| 2004–05
| style="text-align:left;"| Washington State
| 25 || 10 || 19.6 || .387 || .091 || .551 || 3.2 || 2.0 || .6 || .4 || 4.8
|-
| style="text-align:left;"| 2005–06
| style="text-align:left;"| Washington State
| 27 || 25 || 29.7 || .483 || .276 || .688 || 4.3 || 4.0 || 1.4 || .7 || 8.6
|-
| style="text-align:left;"| 2006–07
| style="text-align:left;"| Washington State
| 34 || 33 || 33.9 || .487 || .237 || .770 || 5.6 || 4.6 || 2.2 || 1.2 || 11.2
|-
| style="text-align:left;"| 2007–08
| style="text-align:left;"| Washington State
| 35 || 35 || 33.1 || .463 || .364 || .733 || 5.3 || 4.3 || 1.7 || .7 || 12.2
|- class="sortbottom"
| style="text-align:center;" colspan="2"| Career
| 121 || 103 || 29.8 || .464 || .277 || .716 || 4.7 || 3.8 || 1.6 || .8 || 9.6

References

External links
Twitter
EuroCup Profile
Basketball-Reference.com Profile
RealGM.com Profile
Eurobasket.com Profile
Greek Basket League Profile 

1986 births
Living people
African-American basketball players
Alba Berlin players
American expatriate basketball people in Belgium
American expatriate basketball people in Germany
American expatriate basketball people in Greece
American expatriate basketball people in Israel
American expatriate basketball people in Italy
American expatriate basketball people in Lithuania
American expatriate basketball people in Poland
American men's basketball players
Aris B.C. players
Austin Toros players
Basketball players at the 2007 Pan American Games
Basketball players from Wisconsin
BC Neptūnas players
Bnei Hertzeliya basketball players
Caciques de Humacao players
Canton Charge players
Charlotte Bobcats draft picks
Iowa Energy players
Oklahoma City Thunder players
Roseto Sharks players
Science City Jena players
Shooting guards
Small forwards
Spirou Charleroi players
Sportspeople from Beloit, Wisconsin
Tulsa 66ers players
Twarde Pierniki Toruń players
Utah Jazz players
Washington State Cougars men's basketball players
Pan American Games competitors for the United States
21st-century African-American sportspeople
20th-century African-American people